WXEL may refer to:

 WXEL-TV, a television station (channel 42) licensed to West Palm Beach, Florida, United States
 WFLV, a radio station (90.7 FM) licensed to West Palm Beach, Florida, which held the call sign WXEL from 1985 to 2011
 WJW (TV), a television station (channel 8) licensed to Cleveland, Ohio, United States, which formerly used the call sign WXEL